Odile Decq (born 1955) is a French architect, urban planner and academic. She is the founder of the Paris firm, Studio Odile Decq and the architecture school, Confluence Institute. Decq is known for her self-described goth appearance and style.

Education
In the 1970s, Odile Decq first entered École Régionale d'Architecture de Rennes. She was told by the first year director that she would never become an architect because she did not possess the right spirit. She completed two years at Rennes, then moved to Paris, where she enrolled at La Villette (formerly called UP6). Because of the Protests of 1968, Decq spent a lot of time on strike, instead of in class.

In order to finance her education, she began to work for French writer, architect, and urban planner Philippe Boudon. Boudon was writing about theory of architecture at that time, and was interested in Decq because of her studies in literature and linguistics. Decq began reading for Boudon, and later went on writing for him. After four years, Decq resigned from her job with Boudon to pursue her diploma.

She graduated in 1978 from École nationale supérieure d'architecture de Paris-La Villette with a diploma in urban planning from the Paris Institute of Political Studies in 1979.

Career 
Decq opened her own firm in 1979. Her future partner in the firm and in life,  Benoît Cornette, was studying medicine at the time. In 1985 Cornette earned a degree in architecture and the couple established the architecture firm ODBC. The buildings they completed for the Banque Populaire de l’Ouest in Rennes with Peter Rice in 1990 brought them numerous awards and international recognition. It was the first metal-construction office building in France.

Model building is especially important to her process. Decq and Benoît would create models with modular parts that could be moved in order to test the feasibility of various configurations.

Decq has stated that her philosophy on architecture is that a building " has to be a place where people can move, live in good conditions, forget the hardness of the life outside, so it has to have a kind of humanistic approach..."

She has "been faithful to her fighting attitude while diversifying and radicalizing her research." Being awarded the Golden Lion of Architecture during the Venice Biennale in 1996 acknowledged her early and unusual career. Other than just a style, an attitude or a process, Odile Decq’s work materializes a complete universe that embraces urban planning, architecture, design and art. Her multidisciplinary approach was recently recognized with the Jane Drew Prize in 2016, and Architizer’s Lifetime Achievement Award in 2017.

Since 1992, Odile Decq has been a professor at the École Spéciale d’Architecture in Paris where she was elected head of the Department of Architecture in 2007. She left in 2012 and subsequently designed and opened her own school, Confluence Institute for Innovation and Creative Strategies in Architecture, in Lyon, France. in 2014. Odile Decq co-founded and led the school along with architect Matteo Cainer. She describes her approach to education as forcing students to take a strong position to foster their independence and ability to "express themselves strongly and very clearly."

In 1998 Cornette died in a car accident at the age of 45. Decq continued to work under the firm ODBC, but in 2013 changed the name to Studio Odile Decq. The name change was prompted by her late husband still being credited with buildings that were solely her design. Despite her husband's death, Decq began experimenting with her designs and ideas even more and trying to find herself again, and soon producing some of her most well-known and successful designs including the Banque Populaire de l'Ouest in Rennes, the Golden Lion at the Venice Architecture Biennale, and the Macro Museum in Rome. Her projects have grown and continue to grow larger in size, complexity, and daring.

Notable works
 1990 – Banque populaire de l’Ouest (BPO), administrative and social centers, Rennes, France
 1996 – Scenography of the French pavilion, Venice Biennale of Architecture
 1998 – University of Nantes, formation center, library and science building
 1999 – Viaduct and Operation Center of the A14 motorway, Nanterre, France
 2001 – Redevelopment and furniture design of the UNESCO Conference Hall, Paris, France
 2007 – Greenland Pavilion, Shanghai, China
 2010 – MACRO, Museum of Contemporary Art of Rome, Italy (extension-renovation)
 2011 – PHANTOM, L'Opéra Restaurant of the Opéra Garnier in Paris, France
 2012 – FRAC Bretagne, Regional Contemporary Art Fund, Rennes, France
 2014 – GL Events Headquarters in Lyon, France
 2015 – Pentania, mix of residential buildings and individual houses, Lille, France
 2015 – Fangshan Tangshan National Geopark Museum, museum of Geology and Anthropology, Nanjing, China
 2015 – Maison Bernard, Antti Lovag's Bubble Palace, Théoule-sur-Mer, France(renovation)
 2015 – Confluence Institute for Innovation and Creative Strategies in Architecture, school in Lyon, France (renovation-rehabilitation)
 2015 – Saint-Ange, artist's residency, Seyssins, France
 2016 – Le CARGO, offices and startup incubator, Paris, France
 2020 - Antares building, Barcelona, Spain

Awards and honors
1986 – Albums of young architects, with Benoît Cornette
1990 – Nominated for Prix de l’Équerre d’Argent
1990 – Architecture and Working Space Award - AMO
1990 – Premier Award, Ninth International Prize for Architecture, London 1990
1991 – Special Mention – the Iritecna of Europe Award – Milan, Italy
1991 – Regional Award – Rennes, France
1991 – International Award of Architecture Andrea Palladio
1992 – Oscar du Design, Le Nouvel Economiste, Paris
1996 – Golden Lion of the Venice Biennale of Architecture, with Benoît Cornette
1996 – Best Steel Construction Awards – Paris, France – Banque Popularie de l’Ouest
1999 – Benedictus Awards – Washington, USA – University of Nantes
2001 – Commander of the Order of Arts and Letters, France
2003 – Knight of the National Order of the Legion of Honor, France
2005 – Passeport Artiste Sans Frontière – AFAA Paris, France
2006 – International Architecture Awards – Chicago Athenaeum – L. Museum
2007 – International Fellowship of the Royal Institute of British Architects, RIBA
2007 – Show Boats International Awards – Monaco – Esense Wally 143’
2008 – World Architecture Community Awards – Sea Passenger Terminal in Tanger
2008 – World Architecture Community Awards – Macro
2008 – Culture World Architecture Festival – Barcelona – Greenland Pavilion
2008 – Athenaeum International Architecture Award – GL Events HQ
2009 – MIPIM AR Future Project Award – GL Events HQ
2010 – Premio di Architettura Ance Catania – Macro
2010 – Athenaeum International Architecture Award – Tangier Med Sea Passenger Terminal
2012 – Paris Shop & Design Award – Cafes, Restaurants – Phantom
2012 – Ecola Award – Phantom
2013 – Women in Architecture Prize, ARVHA
2013 – MAISON&OBJET Designer of the Year
2013 – Athenaeum International Architecture Award – Phantom
2014 – Médaille de Vermeil et d’Honneur de l’Académie d’Architecture
2014 – Dedalo Minosse Special Prize – Marco
2015 – Targhe d’Oro / Gold Plaque – Unione Italiana Disegno
2015 – Nanjing Municipal Architecture Prize – Tangshan Museum
2015 – Jiangsu Provincial Architecture Award – Tangshan Museum
2015 – Doctorate honoris causa in architecture, Université Laval
2015 – Blueprint Award – Saint-Ange Residence – Best Non-public Use Residential Project
2016 – National Wood Construction Prize – Saint-Ange Residence
2016 – Jane Drew Prize, Architects' Journal
2016 – Athenaeum International Architecture Award – Tangshan Museum
2017 – NYCXDesign Award – Soleil Noir – Best Suspension Lamp
2017 – Architizer A+Awards — Lifetime Achievement Award
2018 - European Cultural Centre Architecture Award, Venice

References

External links 
Davidson, Cynthia C, and Odile Decq. “A Conversation with Odile Decq.” Log, no. 32 (January 1, 2014): 39–45. https://search.ebscohost.com/login.aspx?direct=true&db=bvh&AN=721730&site=ehost-live.

Foges, Chris. “A Steely Gaze: Odile Decq Draws from Lyon’s Industrial Context to Project the Waterfront’s New Identity.” Architectural Record, Building types study n.948. Office buildings, 202, no. 7 (July 1, 2014): 65–71. https://search.ebscohost.com/login.aspx?direct=true&db=bvh&AN=716082&site=ehost-live.

Schwitalla, Ursula,, Itsuko Hasegawa, Nili Portugali, Donna Blagg, Alison Kirkland, and Steven Lindberg. Women in Architecture: Past, Present, and Future. Berlin: Hatje Cantz Verlag, 2021.
 Interview with Odile Decq about - What is architecture?

1955 births
Living people
People from Laval, Mayenne
21st-century French architects
French women architects
Sciences Po alumni
Rennes 2 University alumni
Columbia University faculty
Academic staff of the Université de Montréal
Chevaliers of the Légion d'honneur
Commandeurs of the Ordre des Arts et des Lettres
21st-century French women